This is a list of notable persons affiliated with Duquesne University, including alumni, current and former faculty members, and students.

Notable alumni

Media

Tom Atkins – actor, Lethal Weapon, The Rockford Files, Harry O, Oz
Carl Betz – actor, The Donna Reed Show, Judd for the Defense
Peter Brunette – film critic (The Hollywood Reporter) and film historian
John Clayton (1976) – NFL writer and reporter for ESPN
Werner Herzog – filmmaker (did not officially graduate)
Bill Hillgrove (1962) – sports journalist, radio personality, broadcaster
Jesse Joyce – stand-up comedian and writer
Mark Madden – former World Championship Wrestling commentator, writer, ESPN Radio personality
Terry McGovern – film actor, television broadcaster, radio personality, voice-over specialist, and acting instructor
Nick Perry – radio-TV personality, infamous after being indicted in scandal involving rigging of Pennsylvania Lottery
Joe Starkey – writer for the Pittsburgh Tribune-Review; ESPN Radio personality
Tim J. Sullivan (1994) – deputy sports editor for the New York Post

Business
Alan N. Braverman – Senior Executive Vice President, Secretary, and General Counsel of The Walt Disney Company, 2003–present
Pat Dudley (MA) – President and marketing director of Bethel Heights Vineyard
Ed Grier – President of the Disneyland Resort in Anaheim, California
Stanley R. Gumberg - real estate developer
Tom Tribone – founder and CEO of Guggenheim Global Infrastructure Company

Religion

Most Rev. Richard Henry Ackerman – Bishop of Covington (Kentucky), 1960-1978; attended the Second Vatican Council
Most Rev. Daniel DiNardo (1969) – Archbishop of the Roman Catholic Archdiocese of Galveston-Houston (2006–present)
Most Rev. Ralph Leo Hayes – Bishop of Helena (1933–1935), Rector of the Pontifical North American College (1935–1944), and Bishop of Davenport (1944–1966)
Most Rev. Vincent Leonard – Bishop of Pittsburgh (1969–1983)
Zola Levitt – Messianic Jewish teacher, author, and television host
Adam Joseph Cardinal Maida (1964)  – Cardinal, Archbishop of Detroit (1990–present)
Thomas L. Thompson (1962) – Biblical theologian, closely associated with the Biblical minimalism movement
Most Rev. David Zubik (1971) – Bishop of Green Bay (2003–2007), Bishop of Pittsburgh (2007–present)

Sports

Mike Basrak – played center and linebacker for NFL's Pittsburgh Steelers
Joe Beimel – relief pitcher for Pittsburgh Pirates
Leigh Bodden – NFL defensive back, New England Patriots
Boyd Brumbaugh – former NFL player and first-round draft pick
Donn Clendenon (1978) – MLB player for Pittsburgh Pirates, New York Mets; 1969 World Series MVP
Chuck Cooper – first African American player to be drafted into the NBA
Mickey Davis – former NBA player for Milwaukee Bucks
Aldo Donelli – player and head coach in NFL; member of United States National Soccer Hall of Fame
Al Federoff, Major League Baseball player
Candace Futrell – WNBA player
Chip Ganassi – former professional racecar driver; current professional race team owner
Sihugo Green – NBA player (1957; 1959–1966) 
Korie Hlede – WNBA player
Mike James – professional basketball player, Detroit Pistons, Toronto Raptors, Washington Wizards; has won one NBA Championship
Shawn James – professional basketball player for Maccabi Tel Aviv
Ray Kemp - professional football player, first African-American to play for Pittsburgh Steelers
Stefan Lundberg – professional soccer player for Pittsburgh Riverhounds
Barry Nelson – former NBA player
Norm Nixon – professional basketball player for Los Angeles Lakers and Los Angeles Clippers, 2-time NBA champion and 4-time All-Star
Cumberland Posey – Negro league baseball player, manager, and team owner; Baseball Hall of Famer
Dave Ricketts – former MLB player
Dick Ricketts – NBA's first overall pick in annual player draft (1955); also played Major League Baseball
Art Rooney – Pittsburgh Steelers founder and former owner, member of Pro Football Hall of Fame
Dan Rooney – Pittsburgh Steelers president and chairman, member of Pro Football Hall of Fame
Jimmy Smith – former MLB player; won one World Series
Dwayne Woodruff – defensive back for NFL's Pittsburgh Steelers (1979–1990), won one Super Bowl; founding partner of Woodruff, Flaherty & Fardo law firm (now Flaherty Fardo, LLC); currently Judge of Court of Common Pleas in Pittsburgh

Politics and law

 
Donald A. Bailey – politician and lawyer 
Derrick Bell – legal theorist
Mark Ciavarella – Disbarred former Luzerne County judge following the Kids for cash scandal.
Anthony Colaizzo – Democratic member of Pennsylvania House of Representatives, 1989-1999
Father James Cox – Roman Catholic priest, labor activist, and presidential candidate
Bob Cranmer – County Commissioner of Allegheny County, Pennsylvania, 1995-1999; former Chairman of Republican Party of Allegheny County
Henry Ellenbogen – Pennsylvania Congressman (1933-1938) 
Gerald Feierstein (M.A. c:a 1975) – diplomat 
Joseph M. Gaydos (1947) – Pennsylvania delegate to U.S. House of Representatives; first Slovak-American elected to Congress
General Michael V. Hayden (1967) (1969) – retired United States Air Force General; former Director of CIA
Ernest Kline – Lieutenant Governor of Pennsylvania, 1971–1979; dropped out because of inability to pay
Catherine Baker Knoll – Lieutenant Governor of Pennsylvania 
Thomas Patrick Melady (1970) – diplomat and professor at the Institute of World Politics
Charles Owen Rice – Roman Catholic priest; labor activist
Karen Garver Santorum – wife of U.S. Senator Rick Santorum of Pennsylvania
Thomas E. Scanlon – Congressman (1941-1945)
Bud Shuster – Congressman (1972-2001)
William S. Stickman IV - Judge for the United States District Court for the Western District of Pennsylvania
Terry Van Horne (1968) – member of Pennsylvania House of Representatives, 1981–2000
Samuel A. Weiss – judge and Congressman (1941 to 1946)

Music

Joseph Carl Breil – first person to compose a score specifically for a motion picture
Jared DePasquale – composer
Gene Forrell – composer and conductor
Henry Mazer - conductor and recording artist for Taipei Philharmonic Orchestra and Chicago Symphony Orchestra
Sammy Nestico –  composer and arranger of big band music
William Schultz (1950) – President and CEO of Fender Musical Instruments Corporation
Bobby Vinton (graduated 1956; honorary Doctorate in Music in 1978) – "The Polish Prince," recording artist, called most successful love singer of rock era

Literature
Ray DiPalma (1966) – poet and visual artist
Keith Donohue – novelist; Director of Communications for National Historical Publications and Records Commission
Linda O. Johnston – author of mystery and romance novels
Jerome Loving (MA) - professor of American Literature and Culture at the University of Texas at Austin
Sean Parnell – author of Outlaw Platoon

Other
George Delahunty – physiologist, endocrinologist, and Lilian Welsh Professor of Biology at Goucher College
Dennis Fitch – member of flight crew of United Airlines Flight 232 that crash-landed in Sioux City, Iowa in 1989, credited with saving 185 of 296 aboard, cited as example of benefits of Cockpit Resource Management
Constance Flanagan – professor of civil society and community studies
Mary Ellen Smith Glasgow - nurse and professor
Jenna Morasca - model
Monique Samuels - television personality, The Real Housewives of Potomac
Laurie Trok - graphic artist

Notable faculty
Dr. Francesco Cesareo – Renaissance historian, President of Assumption College (former Dean of the McAnulty College of Liberal Arts)
Jerry Clack - Professor of Classical Languages
Radhika Gajjala – communications and a cultural studies professor
Samuel John Hazo – author of poetry, fiction, essays and plays (Emeritus McAnulty Distinguished Professor of English)
James Houlik – tenor saxophonist (Professor of Saxophone and Chair of Woodwinds)
Dr. Patrick Juola – expert in field of computer linguistics and security, credited with co-creating original biometric word list (Professor of Computer Science)
Maureen Lally-Green – Judge on Superior Court of Pennsylvania (Adjunct Professor at School of Law)
Aaron L. Mackler – conservative rabbi (Professor of Theology)
Cardinal Adam Maida – Archbishop of Detroit 1990-2009 (former adjunct Professor of Theology at School of Law)
Magali Cornier Michael – feminist literary theorist (Associate Professor of English and co-director of Women's and Gender Studies program)
Dr. John E. Murray – author of Murray on Contracts; former dean of University of Pittsburgh School of Law and the Villanova University School of Law (University Chancellor and Professor of Law)
James Purdy – scholar of digital rhetoric
John Walker – concert organist, choirmaster, recording artist (Adjunct Professor of Organ and Sacred Music (1997–2006))
Dr. Cyril Wecht – forensic pathologist
Dr. Michael Welner – forensic psychiatrist

Heads of Duquesne University

Duquesne University was founded in 1878 as the Pittsburgh Catholic College of the Holy Ghost by a group of Spiritan priests under the leadership of Father Joseph Strub.

Table

Graphical timeline

References for notable alumni

References for heads of Duquesne University

Duquesne University
Dynamic lists
Duquesne University people